Pubilla Cases is a station on line 5 of the Barcelona Metro.

The station is located underneath Doctor Ramon Solanich in L'Hospitalet de Llobregat, between Plaça Mare de Déu del Pilar and Carrer El·lipse. It was opened in 1973 and served as terminus until the extension to Sant Ildefons in 1976.

The side-platform station has a ticket hall on either end, the western one with two accesses, the eastern one (at platform level) with one access.

Services

See also
List of Barcelona Metro stations
Transport in L'Hospitalet de Llobregat

External links
 Pubilla Cases at Trenscat.com

Railway stations in Spain opened in 1973
Barcelona Metro line 5 stations
Railway stations in L'Hospitalet de Llobregat